The Korg i3 is a keyboard instrument introduced by Korg in 1993.  Known as an "Interactive Music Workstation", the i3 broke new ground for Korg, and defined a new type of instrument - the professional auto-accompaniment workstation.  Contrary to popular belief, it was not Korg's first foray into the realm of auto-accompaniment - it had a minor hit in 1985 with the SAS-20, a home keyboard with built-in speakers.

Previously, the auto-accompaniment concept was not taken seriously by professional users, who saw it more the preserve of home hobbyists, and the market had been dominated by low-cost machines made by the likes of Casio and Yamaha.  Roland's E-Series line had made inroads into improving the reputation of auto-accompaniment, but there was still some way to go.

Retailing for $2500, the i3 used a 32-voice tone generation system derived from the X3, using the company's familiar AI2 synthesis system.  All 340 tones were user-editable (max. 64 user voices could be saved in backed RAM + 2 user drum sets) and sampled at 32 kHz.  The auto-accompaniment section consisted of 48 in-built styles, each consisting of 4 variations, 2 fill-ins, and 2 intros/endings.   There were a further 4 "blank" spaces for user styles to be loaded into non-volatile RAM via a 3.5" DD floppy disk and 4 from a memory card.  There were also two sequencers; a conventional 16-track General MIDI  compatible system for the editing and playback of SMF data, whilst there was also a "Backing Sequencer" - effectively a simple recorder for recording of performances using the auto-accompaniment system, but had the ability to add a further 10 tracks over this.  The most obvious sign to the user that the i3 was a departure from the usual auto-accompaniment keyboard format was the lack of built in speakers.

Early reviews of the i3 were favourable, and the company released a 76-note version (the i2) shortly afterward, whilst a version equipped with speakers, the i4S debuted in 1994.  A further cut down version (the i5S) followed in 1996.

The auto-accompaniment workstation concept was quickly imitated by other manufacturers, most notably Roland's G-800, launched in 1995.  Korg replaced the i3 in 1998 with the i30, and its speakered siblings the iS40 and iS50.

References

I
Music workstations
Polyphonic synthesizers
Digital synthesizers